The 2007 Test Valley Borough Council election took place on the 3 May 2007. All 48 seats were up for election. 24 seats were needed for a majority, with the Conservatives increasing their majority by three seats. Both independents lost their seats, one to the Conservatives and one to the Liberal Democrats, who in turn lost a seat to the Conservatives.

Results 

|-bgcolor=#F6F6F6
| colspan=2 style="text-align: right; margin-right: 1em" | Total
| style="text-align: right;" | 48
| colspan=5 |
| style="text-align: right;" | 34536
| style="text-align: right;" |
|-

Ward results

Abbey

Alamein

Ampfield and Braishfield

Amport

Anna

Blackwater

Bourne Valley

Broughton and Stockbridge

Charlton

Chilworth, Nursling and Rownhams

Cupernham

Dun Valley

Harewood

Harroway

Kings Somborne and Michelmersh

Millway

North Baddesley

Over Wallop

Penton Bellinger

Romsey Extra

St Mary's

Tadburn

Valley Park

Winton

References 

2007 English local elections
May 2007 events in the United Kingdom
Test Valley Borough Council elections
2000s in Hampshire